Treamble is a hamlet northeast of Perranporth, Cornwall, England, United Kingdom.

References

Hamlets in Cornwall